Toom is a common surname in Estonia. Notable people with the surname include:

Alo Toom (born 1986), Estonian wrestler
Andrei Toom (born 1942), Russian mathematician
Artur Toom (1884–1942), Estonian ornithologist and conservationist
Johannes Toom (1896–1972), Estonian weightlifter
Merily Toom (born 1994), Estonian footballer
Taavi Toom (born 1970), Estonian diploma
Tanel Toom (born 1982), Estonian director and screenwriter
Yana Toom (born 1966), Estonian politician

See also

Toon (name)
Toome (surname)
Tohme (surname)

Estonian-language surnames